The A2 is a major motorway (freeway) in Portugal. It connects Lisbon, the political capital of Portugal, and the 25 de Abril Bridge to Albufeira in Algarve, the country's southernmost mainland province. The first section of the A2 was opened in 1966 and the last one was completed in 2002. It extends for fractionally more than 240 km (149 miles). The A2 is operated by Brisa - Auto-estradas de Portugal. A trip from Lisbon to Albufeira using the A2 costs €20.85

Sections of the road carry very little traffic.

External links
 BRISA - Auto-estradas de Portugal S. A. Web site

References

Motorways in Portugal